Tarzan's Deadly Silence is a 1970 adventure film composed of an edited two-part television episode of Tarzan released as a feature.  It stars Ron Ely as Tarzan. Former Tarzan actor Jock Mahoney and Woody Strode (a veteran of two previous Tarzan films) co-star.  The film was produced by Sy Weintraub and Leon Benson, written by Lee Erwin, Jack H. Robinson, John Considine, and Tim Considine (based on the character created by Edgar Rice Burroughs) and directed by Robert L. Friend.

Premise
Tarzan loses his hearing after a bomb blast, and is hunted through the jungle by the ruthless Colonel.

Cast
Ron Ely as Tarzan
Jock Mahoney as The Colonel, a villain
Woody Strode as Marshak
Manuel Padilla, Jr. as Jai, Tarzan's youthful ward
Nichelle Nichols as Ruana

Production notes
The film consists of The Deadly Silence, a two-part episode of Ely's Tarzan series.

The Deadly Silence, Part I, aired on October 28, 1966.  It was written by Lee Erwin and Jack H. Robinson, and directed by Robert L. Friend.
The Deadly Silence, Part II, aired on November 4, 1966.  It was written by John Considine and Tim Considine, and directed by Lawrence Dobkin, who was not credited in the theatrical release of the film.

Jock Mahoney's first appearance in Tarzan films was as Coy Banton, a villain opposite Gordon Scott's Tarzan in the 1960 film Tarzan the Magnificent.  He took over the role of the Ape Man in 1962's Tarzan Goes to India.  This was followed by his final turn as Tarzan in Tarzan's Three Challenges (1963).

Woody Strode portrayed Ramo in Tarzan's Fight for Life (1958), and Khan in Tarzan's Three Challenges (1963).

External links
 

1970 films
1970s fantasy adventure films
American fantasy adventure films
American sequel films
Tarzan films
1970s English-language films
1970s American films